Elizabeth Forward High School is a midsized suburban, four-year comprehensive public high school located in Elizabeth, Pennsylvania, as part of the Elizabeth Forward School District. On February 12, 2023, the school caught on fire, causing extensive damage in the auditorium side of the building, and causing smoke, water, and fire damage throughout the majority of the building. The cause of the fire is currently unknown and is currently closed until further notice.

Location
Elizabeth Forward School District is composed of the Borough of Elizabeth, and the townships of Elizabeth and Forward. Located just south of the city of Pittsburgh, the district lies between the Youghiogheny River and Monongahela River valleys in the southernmost region of Allegheny County. Communities of Elizabeth Township include Greenock, Mount Vernon, Central, Boston, Buena Vista, Industry, Blaine Hill, Blythedale, Smithdale and Victory. Communities of Forward Township include East Monongahela, Bunola, Sunny Side, River Hill, 51 Estates, and Axelton.  Bordering areas include McKeesport, Pleasant Hills, Belle Vernon, Monongahela, West Mifflin, Jefferson Borough, West Elizabeth, and Versailles.

Extracurriculars
The district offers a variety of clubs and activities.

Marching band
The school has a marching band that competes regularly. There is also an Indoor Color Guard. The Indoor Percussion Ensemble finished its season by winning gold in the Scholastic A Percussion Standstill Division at the Tournament Indoor Association Championships in 2011. Additionally, the school's Indoor Majorettes. The group took first place and was named Scholastic A Class Champion at the 2011 Tournament Indoor Association Chapter 8 Championships. The booster group is extensive and very active in fund raising.

Athletics
School sponsored athletics include 
 
Fall Sports
Cross Country
Football
Soccer
Volleyball
Golf
Marching Band
Color Guard

Winter Sports
Basketball
Hockey
Indoor Track
Indoor Color Guard
Indoor Percussion Ensemble
Swimming/Diving
Wrestling
Hockey
Skiing/Snowboarding

Spring Sports
Baseball
Track & Field
Softball

Rivalries

Elizabeth Forward has several rivalries with other local school districts.  The most notable rivalry is with Thomas Jefferson High School.  This rivalry is fueled through nearly every sport.  Another major rivalry is with Belle Vernon Area High School.  Another minor rivalry that has died down is West Mifflin Area High School.

Notable alumni
Anthony Rubino, former tackle for the Detroit Lions
Bill Robinson, former right fielder for the Pittsburgh Pirates, New York Yankees and Philadelphia Phillies.
Jim Brumfield, former running back for the Pittsburgh Steelers
Greg Paterra, former running back for the Atlanta Falcons, Detroit Lions, and Buffalo Bills.
Pete Rostosky, former offensive lineman for the Pittsburgh Steelers.
Brian Holton, former MLB pitcher for the Baltimore Orioles and the Los Angeles Dodgers.
Dave Molinari, writer for Pittsburgh Post-Gazette, Hockey Hall of Fame.
J. J. Hoover, MLB relief pitcher for the Arizona Diamondbacks, Cincinnati Reds.
Dan Altavilla, MLB pitcher for the Seattle Mariners

References

Public high schools in Pennsylvania
Schools in Allegheny County, Pennsylvania